Hayatullah is an Afghan cricketer. He made his first-class debut on 20 February 2019, for Kunduz Province in the 2018–19 Mirwais Nika Provincial 3-Day. He scored a century and was named the player of the match. He made his Twenty20 debut on 7 October 2019, for Band-e-Amir Dragons in the 2019 Shpageeza Cricket League.

References

External links
 

Year of birth missing (living people)
Living people
Afghan cricketers
Band-e-Amir Dragons cricketers
Place of birth missing (living people)
21st-century Afghan people